Patrick Moffitt is an American football player and coach. He played as a quarterback at Williams College for the Ephs,
leading the team to a 20–4 record. After his senior season, Patrick was awarded the Gold Helmet Award as Player of the Year in New England for all of Division II and III. After Williams, Moffitt assisted the Norwich Cadets.

References

Norwich Cadets football coaches
American football quarterbacks
Williams Ephs football players